Tajuria melastigma, the branded royal, is a species of lycaenid or blue butterfly found in the Indomalayan realm (in India, Assam, Burma, Thailand).

Description

References

External links
Tajuria at Markku Savela's Lepidoptera and Some Other Life Forms

Tajuria
Butterflies described in 1887
Butterflies of Asia
Taxa named by Lionel de Nicéville